Ministry of Higher Education, Science and Technology may refer to:

 Ministry of Higher Education, Science and Technology (Dominican Republic)
 Ministry of Higher Education, Science and Technology (Kenya)
 Ministry of Higher Education, Science and Technology (South Sudan)
 Ministry of Science, Technology and Higher Education (Tanzania), succeeded (formerly the Ministry of Science, Technology and Higher Education)
 Ministry of Higher Education, Science and Technology (Zimbabwe)

See also 
 Ministry of Science, Technology and Higher Education, Portugal